Poyner Township is one of seventeen rural townships in Black Hawk County, Iowa, USA.  As of the 2000 census, its population was 2581.

History
The township was named for Nathan Poyner, a pioneer minister.

Geography
According to the USGS, it contains four cemeteries: Poyner Township, Saint Joseph's, Saint Mary's and Saint Mary's Catholic.

References

External links
 US-Counties.com
 City-Data.com

Townships in Black Hawk County, Iowa
Waterloo – Cedar Falls metropolitan area
Townships in Iowa